Concord Dawn is a New Zealand drum and bass group, active since mid-1999, consisting of Matt Harvey (aka Matty C). Until 2010, Evan Short was one half of the group. They were courted by local electronic music label Kog Transmissions and released their first album, Concord Dawn, in July 2000.

History
After touring their first album throughout New Zealand, they released their second album Disturbance in April 2001 and received "Best Electronic Album" and "Best Independent Release" at the 2001 bNet Music Awards. Following this they started working on their third album: Uprising. Tracks like "Morning Light" and "Don’t Tell Me" found very high international acclaim well before the album’s release. Uprising was released in New Zealand in September 2003 and reached gold sales status in three months, going on to eventually reach platinum sales in New Zealand.

Concord Dawn have become established internationally and their catalog is distributed worldwide. They went off on a world tour, traveling through the United States, Canada, Europe, Asia and Australia. At the 2003 bNet music awards, the song "Morning Light" won "Best Song" and "Most Radio Play". At the 2004 bNet music awards, Uprising received "Best Album" and "Best Electronic Release". Concord Dawn were nominated for "Best Electronic Act" at the 2004 New Zealand music awards.

Work on their long-awaited fourth album was completed in early 2005 and was titled Chaos by Design by the two to express the album’s musically eclectic nature. The album and singles won critical acclaim worldwide with various tracks off the albums being signed to some big and respected drum and bass labels such as Metalheadz, Ram Records and Hospital Records.

Concord Dawn were nominated for "Best Tech DJ", "Best International Act" and "Best Producer" at the 2009 UK Drum and Bass Awards. Chaos by Design achieved Gold sales status in New Zealand.
Concord Dawn have two of the top 20 selling records of all time at www.chemical-records.co.uk, "Dont Tell Me" and "Morning Light", which were released on Timeless Records.

Concord Dawn's live sets are well regarded as encompassing the full spectrum of drum and bass music, and this has seen constant tours and performances in Europe, Russia, Australasia, Asia and North America since the turn of the century.

Concord Dawn now only features member Matt Harvey, Evan Short left the group for reasons unknown. Following after his departure was The Enemy Within LP in 2010. The first solo Concord Dawn EP entitled The Race to Zero EP was released in 2011 (also titled The Race To Zero Volume 1 on 5 September 2011). The Wipeout EP featuring New Zealand's TREi was released in early 2012 

2012's Air Chrysalis LP, released for free via the artists Facebook and SoundCloud pages, won "Best Electronica LP' at the 2012 RIANZ New Zealand Music Awards.

Concord Dawn released the single "Moonlighting" with Tali on 25 June 2014.

Discography

Albums

EPs

Non-album tracks

References

External links
 Amplifier.co.nz - Concord Dawn
 Muzic.net.nz - Concord Dawn
 Concord Dawn's MySpace profile
 Concord Dawn's Biography
 
 

New Zealand electronic music groups
Drum and bass duos
Musical groups established in 1999
1999 establishments in New Zealand